Samuel Ludlow may refer to:
 Samuel Ludlow (judge)
 Samuel Ludlow (surgeon)